The Palm Trees & Power Lines Tour was the fifth concert tour by American pop rock band Maroon 5, launched in support of the third album Hands All Over (2010). The tour began on July 27, 2010 in New York City and concluded on October 29, 2010 in Mahnomen, Minnesota, comprising 39 concerts.

Opening acts
 Ry Cuming 
 OneRepublic 
 Bruno Mars & the Hooligans 
 Jason Segel 
 Janelle Monáe 
 Guster 
 Owl City 
 VV Brown 
 Kris Allen 
 Miggs

Setlist

 "Misery"
 "If I Never See Your Face Again"
 "Harder to Breathe"
 "Give a Little More"
 "Roxanne"  / "The Sun"
 "Won't Go Home Without You"
 "Never Gonna Leave This Bed"
 "Secret" / "What's Love Got to Do with It" 
 "Wake Up Call"
 "Let's Stay Together"  / "She Will Be Loved"
 "Shiver"
 "Stutter"
 "Makes Me Wonder"
 "This Love"
Encore

Shows

Cancelled shows

Notes

References

2010 concert tours
Maroon 5 concert tours
Concert tours of North America
Concert tours of Canada
Concert tours of the United States